Van Cleef & Arpels is a French luxury jewelry company. It was founded in 1896 by the Dutch diamond-cutter Alfred Van Cleef and his father-in-law Salomon Arpels in Paris. Their pieces often feature flowers, animals, and fairies, and have been worn by style icons and royalty such as Grace Kelly, Diana, Princess of Wales, Ava Gardner,  Farah Pahlavi, Eva Perón, Elizabeth Taylor, the Duchess of Windsor and Queen Nazli of Egypt.

History 
The Dutch diamond-cutter Alfred Van Cleef and his father-in-law, Salomon Arpels, founded the company in 1896. In 1906, following Arpels’s death, Alfred and two of his brothers-in-law, Charles and Julien, acquired space for Van Cleef & Arpels at 22 Place Vendôme, across from the Hôtel Ritz, where Van Cleef & Arpels opened its first boutique shop. The third Arpels brother, Louis Arpels, joined the company in 1913.

Van Cleef & Arpels opened boutiques in holiday resorts such as Deauville, Vichy, Le Touquet, Nice, and Monte-Carlo.  In 1925, a Van Cleef & Arpels bracelet with red and white roses fashioned from rubies and diamonds won the grand prize at the International Exposition of Modern Industrial and Decorative Arts.

Alfred and Esther’s daughter, Renée (born Rachel) Puissant, assumed the company’s artistic direction in 1926. Puissant worked closely with draftsman René Sim Lacaze for the next twenty years. Van Cleef & Arpels were the first French jewelers to open boutiques in Japan and China. Compagnie Financière Richemont S.A. acquired the firm in 1999.

In 1966, Van Cleef & Arpels was charged with the task of making the crown of Empress Farah Pahlavi for her upcoming coronation in 1967. A team was sent to Iran to choose the major gems to use for the crown. After 11 months of work, the company presented the empress with a crown made of emerald velvet set with 36 emeralds, 36 rubies, 105 pearls and 1,469 diamonds.

Van Cleef & Arpels was charged with the task of making the crown of Queen Nazli of Egypt in the 1930s.

Boutiques 
Van Cleef & Arpels has stores in the Middle East and South East Asia, with its products offered in standalone boutiques, boutiques within major department stores, and in independent stores. Standalone boutiques are located in Geneva, Zurich, Munich, London, Milan, Shanghai, and Paris, where the company has multiple locations, including its flagship store at Place Vendôme.

In the United States, the company operates standalone boutiques in Boston, New York City, Beverly Hills, Chicago, Houston and Las Vegas. It also maintains stores in Naples, Palm Beach, as well as a location in Aspen. The Chicago boutique opened in 2001 at 636 North Michigan Avenue and moved to a larger location within the Drake Hotel in November 2011 while the New York City flagship store was redesigned in 2013.

The brand expanded to Australia in 2016, opening a boutique at Collins Street, Melbourne. The following year, another boutique opened at Castlereagh Street, Sydney. A second Melbourne boutique is set to open in Chadstone Shopping Centre in 2018.

The Mystery Setting 
On 2 December 1933, Van Cleef and Arpels received French Patent No. 764,966 for a proprietary gem setting style it calls Serti Mysterieux, or "Mystery Setting", a technique employing a setting where the prongs are invisible. Each stone is faceted onto gold rails less than two-tenths of a millimeter thick. The technique can require 300 hours of work per piece or more, and only a few are produced each year.

Chaumet received an English patent for a similar technique in 1904 as did Cartier in 1933, however neither used the process as extensively.

Value 
In 2010/2011, the company's estimated sales were €450 million in total sales and €45 million in watches.

A 1936 Van Cleef & Arpels custom jewelry piece with a "Mystery Setting" sold for $326,500 during an auction at Christie's New York in 2009.

Popular culture 

In the 1971 James Bond film, Diamonds Are Forever, Van Cleef & Arpels gets mentioned by Bond when Tiffany Case discusses the story behind her name: that she was born at Tiffany & Co. as a pre-term baby. Bond responds that she should be fortunate her name is not Van Cleef & Arpels.

In season 4, episode 23 of Frasier, the character Niles Crane is speaking on his mobile phone with his wife Maris, from whom he is recently separated at the time. On the phone, Niles says to Maris 'I miss you more...than Van Cleef would miss Arpels'.

In Issue 116 of New X-Men (2001 series), the character Emma Frost, who has recently gained the power to turn into organic diamond, tells a taxi, "the Van Cleef and Arples store on Fifth at Fifty-Seventh, driver. I intend to have myself valued."

Bibliography

References

External links 

French brands
French jewellers
Comité Colbert members
Jewellery retailers of France
Luxury brands
Retail companies of France
Watch manufacturing companies of France
Van Cleef & Arpels
High fashion brands
Fashion accessory brands
Watch brands
Perfume houses
Companies based in Paris